Balut Radio was an Internet radio service owned by TV5 Network, Inc. It featured OPM and international music channels, as well as news and sports channels powered by News5 and Interaksyon. The website also featured a customizing radio channel for users, similar to Pandora Radio and iHeartRadio.

It was launched on April 1, 2013, as a public beta. As of September 2014, Balut Radio is inactive.

References

External links
Official website

2013 establishments in the Philippines
TV5 Network
Internet radio stations in the Philippines
Radio stations established in 2013